Vladislav Stanislavovich Adayev (born 14 March 1996) is a Russian football player. He plays for FC Chernomorets Novorossiysk.

Club career
He made his debut in the Russian Football National League for FC Mordovia Saransk on 26 March 2017 in a game against FC Fakel Voronezh.

Honours
Torpedo Moscow
 Russian Football National League : 2021-22

References

External links
 Profile by Russian Football National League

1996 births
People from Saransk
Sportspeople from Mordovia
Living people
Russian footballers
Association football forwards
FC Mordovia Saransk players
FC Torpedo Moscow players
FC Chernomorets Novorossiysk players
Russian First League players
Russian Second League players